Plakṣadvīpa is the dvipa ("island" or "continent") of the terrestrial world, as envisioned in the cosmologies of Hinduism, is among seven dvipas as described by Bhagavata Puranas

The word Plakṣadvīpa literally refers to "the land of fig trees" where Plakṣa is the name of the species (also called Plaksl or Fig) and dvīpa means "island" or "continent".

More than 2000 years ago the writers of Puranas have adopted similar method and divided earth in to natural divisions based on the predominant flora or fauna of this region. According to Matsya, Bhagavata Puranas and Brahama Purana the world was divided into 7 dvipas.

They are:

 Jambu Dvipa (land of the Indian berries) — Asia (According to interpretation of Narayan A. Bangera)
 Kusha Dvipa (land of grass) — Australia (According to interpretation of Narayan A. Bangera)
 Plaksha Dvipa (land of the fig trees) — South America (According to interpretation of Narayan A. Bangera)
 Pushkara Dvipa (land of lakes) — Africa (According to interpretation of Narayan A. Bangera)
 Shalmali Dvipa (land of the silk cotton trees) — Antarctica (According to interpretation of Narayan A. Bangera)
 Krauncha Dvipa (land of the krauncha birds or the demoiselle crane) — North America (According to interpretation of Narayan A. Bangera)
 Shaka Dvipa (land of the trees) — Europe (According to interpretation of Narayan A. Bangera)

But in the Brahma Purana, it describes the Seven Continents (sapta-dvīpa) and sub-continents of the world, though some other land mass are not mentioned, those which are mentioned are called:

 Jambū—It is the central one of the seven continents surrounding the mountain Meru, so called either from the Jambū trees abounding in it or from an enormous Jambū tree on Mount Meru visible like a standard to the whole continent. Sec S. M. Ali, Op. cit., chapters V-VII on Jambūdvīpa.
 Śāka can be identified with Malaya, Siam, Indo-China and Southern China or the South-Eastern corner of the land mass of which Jambūdvīpa occupied the centre.
 Kuśa contains Iran, Iraq and the south-western corner of the land mass round Meru.
 Plakṣa identified with the basin of Mediterranean since Plakṣa or the Pākhara tree is the characteristic of warm temperate or Mediterranean lands identifiable with Greece and adjoining lands.
 Puṣkara covers the whole of Japan, Manchuria and the south-eastern Siberia.
 Śālmala—the tropical part of Africa bordering the Indian Ocean on the West. It includes Madagascar which is the Hariṇa of the Purāṇas and the Śaṃkhadvīpa of some other writers of scriptures.
 Krauñca represents by the basin of the Black Sea.
 Upadvīpas (sub-continents): 1) Bhārata 2) Kimpuruṣa 3) Harivarṣa 4) Ramyaka 5) Hiraṇmaya 6) Uttarakuru 7) Ilāvṛta 8) Bhadrāśva and 9) Ketumāla. According to P.E. (p. 342) there are eight long mountain ranges which divide the island Jambu into 9 countries which look like nine petals of the lotus flower. The two countries of the north and south extremities (Bhadra and Ketumāla) are in a bow-shape. The four of the remaining seven are longer than the rest. The central country is known as Ilāvṛta.

References 

Locations in Hindu mythology